
Gmina Wielichowo is an urban-rural gmina (administrative district) in Grodzisk Wielkopolski County, Greater Poland Voivodeship, in west-central Poland.

Villages
Apart from the town of Wielichowo, Gmina Wielichowo contains the villages and settlements of Augustowo, Borek, Celinki, Dębsko, Gradowice, Helenopol, Łubnica, Mokrzec, Pawłówko, Piotrowo Wielkie, Prochy, Pruszkowo, Reńsko, Śniaty, Trzcinica, Wielichowo-Wieś, Wilkowo Polskie, Zielęcin and Ziemin.

Neighbouring gminas
Gmina Wielichowo is bordered by the gminas of Kamieniec, Przemęt, Rakoniewice and Śmigiel.

References

Polish official population figures 2006

Wielichowo
Grodzisk Wielkopolski County